The 1994 Japanese Formula 3000 Championship was contested over 10 rounds. 16 different teams, 30 different drivers, 3 different chassis and 3 different engines competed.

Calendar

Final point standings

Driver

For every race points were awarded: 9 points to the winner, 6 for runner-up, 4 for third place, 3 for fourth place, 2 for fifth place and 1 for sixth place. No additional points were awarded. The best 7 results count.

Complete Overview

R=retired DIS=disqualified

Formula 3000
Super Formula